Roberta Brown (April 12, 1947 – August 4, 1981) was an American athlete. She competed in the women's javelin throw at the 1972 Summer Olympics.

References

External links
 

1947 births
1981 deaths
Athletes (track and field) at the 1972 Summer Olympics
American female javelin throwers
Olympic track and field athletes of the United States
Pan American Games medalists in athletics (track and field)
Athletes (track and field) at the 1971 Pan American Games
Pan American Games silver medalists for the United States
Track and field athletes from Seattle
Medalists at the 1971 Pan American Games
20th-century American women